Nihat Doğan (born 13 February 1976) is a Turkish singer of Kurdish descent. With the release of his first album Kırdın Kalbimi in 1994 he started his professional music career. With participating in Survivor Turkey in 2011 he gained more popularity.

Life 
Nihat Doğan was born on 13 February 1976 in Istanbul. At the age of eleven he lost his father. The elders of his family wanted to take him to Muş but he refused to go and stayed in Istanbul. His talent in singing was discovered at a tea garden in Avcılar, Istanbul, and a couple who were residents of Germany helped him reside there. After staying there for one year, he decided to return to Turkey to pursue a career in music.

Doğan identifies as a conservative democrat.

Other works  
On 22 October 2012, Doğan announced on his Twitter account that he was appointed as the technical director of Büyükderespor, and amateur third class team from Istanbul. As Doğan does not have a diploma in directorship he does not hold the position officially. Following Turkish Football Federation's statement that "if necessary, the technical director of a club could be appointed as the head and admin of a team" Doğan took the management of the team.

Discography

Studio albums 
 1994: Kırdın Kalbimi
 1996: Ayrılık Acı Birşey
 1998: Anlamıyorlar
 2000: Dayan Yüreğim
 2001: Züleyha
 2002: Zor Gelir
 2004: Seve Seve
 2005: Bitanesinden Bitanesine
 2007: Allah Belanı Versin
 2009: 1071

Singles 
 2011: "Arayamadım"
 2014: "O Da Can"
 2018: "Hey Gidi Hey"
 2019: "Hercai"

Filmography 
 2001: Sultan
 2013: Harem (supporting role)

Programs
 Survivor: Ünlüler vs. Gönüllüler – (2012)
 Söylemezsem Olmaz – (2017) – TV presenter
 Survivor 2018 – (2018)

References 

Living people
1976 births
Turkish Muslims
Turkish people of Kurdish descent
Turkish folk musicians
Survivor Turkey contestants